Opportunity Bank Uganda Limited (OBUL), is a commercial bank in Uganda. It received a commercial banking licence from the Bank of Uganda on 25 September 2019.

Location
OBUL's headquarters are located in Opportunity House, at 1259 Old Kira Road, in Kamwookya, a business and residential neighborhood within the city of Kampala, Uganda's capital. The geographical coordinates of the bank's headquarters are 0°20'43.0"N, 32°35'37.0"E (Latitude:0.345278; Longitude:32.593611).

Overview
Opportunity Bank Uganda Limited is a Tier I Financial Institution (Commercial Bank), licensed by the Bank of Uganda, the central bank and national banking regulator. As of September 2019, the financial institution had total assets worth USh132 billion (US$36.3 million),  with shareholders' equity of about USh28 billion (US$7.7 million).

History
This microfinance institution was licensed in 1995 and began operations in 1996 as Faulu Uganda, a programme of Food for the Hungry International, a non-governmental organization. In July 1999, Faulu Uganda incorporated as a limited liability company in Uganda, becoming Faulu Uganda Limited. Under that name, the company became part of the Faulu network in Uganda and Kenya. 

As a credit institution, it was not authorized to offer checking accounts or deal in foreign exchange. The company was however authorized to take in customer deposits and to establish savings accounts. It was also authorized make collateralized and non-collateralized loans to savings and non savings customers. The company later became affiliated with Opportunity International and became a member of their network. Opportunity International specializes in lending to the poorest of the working poor. , the institution's total assets were valued at US$20.53 million, with shareholder's equity of US$7.86 million.

In 2006, Opportunity Transformation Investments and Opportunity International Australia  each purchased a 31.5 percent stake in Faulu Uganda Limited, giving Opportunity International a combined majority stake of 63 percent in the fourth largest microfinance institution in Uganda. In December 2009, Opportunity bought the remaining shares of Faulu Uganda, thereby taking outright ownership of the company. The financial institution was renamed Opportunity Uganda Limited. In November 2011, the institution rebranded to "Opportunity Bank Uganda Limited".

Ownership
The company was owned by five different entities, as of October 2019.In October 2020, TLG Capital based in the United Kingdom, acquired 49 percent shareholding in Opportunity Bank Uganda in exchange for an undisclosed consideration. MyBucks of the United States exited the investment.

Branch network

The branch network of OBUL has included the following locations:

 Kira Road Branch - 80 Kira Road, Kamwookya
 City Center Branch - 14 Kampala Road, Kampala
 Kawempe Branch - 494 Block 204, Goshen House, Kawempe
 Nateete Branch - 715 Masaka Road, Nateete
 Owino Branch - Ovino Shopping Complex, 22 Kisenyi Road, Kampala
 Gayaza Branch - Gayaza-Kampala Road, Gayaza
 Nansana Branch - Hoima Road, Nansana
 Jinja Branch - 9 Skindia Road, Jinja
 Iganga Branch - 88 Main Street, Iganga
 Mbarara Branch - 90 Highway Street, Mbarara
 Masaka Branch - Edward Avenue, Masaka
 Kalagi Branch - Mukono-Kayunga Road, Kalagi
 Mubende Branch - 103 Lubanga Road, Mubende
 Head Office - 7A Acacia Avenue, Kololo, Kampala
 Mayuge Branch - Mayuge
 Mbale Branch - Mbale
 Lira Branch - Obote Avenue, Lira
 Kyenjojo Branch - Kyenjojo
 Hoima Branch - Hoima
 Mukono Branch - Mukono
 Kamdini Branch - Oyam
 Soroti Branch - Soroti
 Mityana Branch - Mityana
Abaita Ababiri Branch - Entebbe

See also
 Banking in Uganda
 List of banks in Uganda
 Faulu Kenya

References

External links
2014 Global Outreach and Financial Performance Benchmark Report

Banks of Uganda
Banks established in 1995
1995 establishments in Uganda
Companies based in Kampala